The Vilsmeier reagent is an organic compound with the formula [(CH3)2NCHCl]Cl.  It is a salt consisting of the N,N-dimethyliminium cation ([(CH3)2N=CHCl]+) and chloride anion. Depending on the particular reaction, the anion can vary.  In typical POCl3-based reactions, the anion is PO2Cl2−. The iminium cation [(CH3)2N=CHCl]+ is the reactive component of interest.  This iminium species is a derivative of the imidoyl chloride CH3N=CHCl. Analogues of this particular reagent are generated when tertiary amides other than DMF are treated with POCl3.

The salt is a white solid that is soluble in polar organic solvents.  Vilsmeier reagent is the active intermediate in the formylation reactions, the Vilsmeier reaction or Vilsmeier-Haack reaction that use mixtures of dimethylformamide and phosphorus oxychloride to generate the Vilsmeier reagent, which in turn attacks a nucleophilic substrate and eventually hydrolyzes to give formyl.  It is a source of "O=CH+".

See also
 Eschenmoser's salt, [(CH3)2NCH2]I

References

Reagents